Wallasey is a town in Wirral, Merseyside, England.  It contains 34 buildings that are recorded in the National Heritage List for England as designated listed buildings.   Of these, two are listed at Grade II*, the middle of the three grades, and the others are at Grade II, the lowest grade.  Originally a number of small separate villages, the town grew in the 19th century to become a dormitory town for Liverpool.  It also contains part of Birkenhead Docks.  There are only four listed buildings dating from before the 19th century, namely the isolated tower of a medieval church, a house, a rectory, and a former grammar school.  The later listed buildings include houses, churches, public houses, buildings associated with the docks, the town hall, part of a school, a watercourse, and two war memorials.

Key

Buildings

References
Citations

Sources

Listed buildings in Merseyside
Lists of listed buildings in Merseyside
Listed